Bolon was a Macedonian soldier, who accused Philotas. He gave a speech at Phrada in 330 BC saying : Philotas had ridiculed men from the country, he continued, calling them Phrygians and Paphlagonians - this from a man who, Macedonian born, was not ashamed to use an interpreter to listen to men who spoke his own language. He is, however, mentioned only by Curtius, who may have invented the individual and the sentiments expressed for dramatic effect.

References
Who's Who in the Age of Alexander the Great by Waldemar Heckel 
Berve ii.110 no. 218; Hoffmann 222

Ancient Macedonian soldiers